Evgeniya Vladimirovna Gutnova (1914 - 1992) was a Soviet Russian historian and medievalist, Doctor of Sciences in Historical Sciences (1957). She was a professor at the Lomonosov Moscow State University (since 1959).

Julius Martov is her uncle. Lydia Dan is her aunt.

She graduated from the Faculty of History at Lomonosov Moscow State University in 1939. She was a student of Eugene Kosminsky.

In 1942, she defended her candidate's dissertation on Thomas Carlyle. Her opponent was A. I. Neusykhin. 
In 1956, she defended her doctoral thesis on the history of the English Parliament. At MSU, she was a Deputy head of Department of History of the Middle Ages, which was then headed by Sergei Skazkin. 

She published in Voprosy Istorii, Soviet Historical Encyclopedia.

References

1914 births
1992 deaths
Soviet professors
Soviet women historians
Soviet historiographers
Soviet medievalists
Women medievalists
Professors of the Moscow State University
Soviet Marxist historians
Historians of England